Lachnoderma asperum is a species of ground beetles from the genus of Lachnoderma.

Description
The species are brownish colored with white eyes.

Distribution
The species live in East Asia, presumably China and Taiwan. They could be found in Chinese cities like: Nantou, Puli, and Shizaitou.

References

Lebiinae
Beetles of Asia
Beetles described in 1883